Alexandra Boyd is a British actress, director, screenwriter and producer. Her acting credits include Clarissa Mason in Coronation Street and Sarah Olmsted in Mr Holland's Opus. In recent years she has turned to screenwriting and film directing. She wrote and directed her debut feature Widow's Walk which debuted on Amazon Prime in December 2019.

On British TV she has appeared in several episodes of Doctors and guest starred in New Tricks and "Holby City". She's been a guest on Loose Women and is the Head of the Delegation in the 2010 John Travolta/Luc Besson action film From Paris with Love. Other film credits include Mr. Holland's Opus and James Cameron's Titanic. She wrote and directed her second film Boxer on the Wilderness ~ a trailer for her feature screenplay (The Wilderness).

Early life 
Alexandra Boyd was born to a Scottish father, David Boyd, and an English mother, Barbara Boyd (née Godbold) in Bangor, Wales. She grew up in Norwich, Norfolk, and was educated at Norwich High School for Girls. She left school at 16 to study full-time at Laine Theatre Arts in Epsom, Surrey. In 1986, she enrolled in the post graduate acting course at Drama Studio, London. She co-founded a theatre company that performed Shakespeare and adapted classics for the London and Edinburgh Fringe. The company also produced English plays for Italy. In the 1993 Italian tour, she played Eliza Doolittle in Pygmalion.

While living in Los Angeles, Boyd studied art history, architecture and design while training as an interior designer at UCLA. She studied with some of the foremost green architects in the United States and writes a blog about living a green and sustainable lifestyle called How Green Is Your Life.

Acting career 
Boyd moved back to the UK in 2006 after living in the US for seventeen years. While living and working in Los Angeles she appeared in Mr. Holland's Opus and James Cameron's Titanic.

On American TV, Boyd made appearances on Party of Five, Sabrina, the Teenage Witch and The Bernie Mac Show. She has performed voices for radio commercials & animated features such as The Wild Thornberries. She is the voice of Elaine Marley in The Curse of Monkey Island, Tales of Monkey Island, Return to Monkey Island and the special editions of The Secret of Monkey Island and Monkey Island 2: LeChuck's Revenge.

On British TV, she played Clarissa Mason on Coronation Street (Granada TV) and Dennis Waterman's love interest in an episode of New Tricks (BBC). She has guest starred in several episodes of BBC1's Doctors and Holby City.

Her theatre credits range from Shakespeare to panto; many Alan Ayckbourn plays; Rita in Educating Rita and Eliza Doolittle in Pygmalion. In 2007 she produced and performed in a one-woman show at the Hackney Empire.

In November 2009 she co-starred with Danny Webb in Visiting Hours, a short film written for her and directed by Steve Hughes. The film played at the Milan International Film Festival 2010 and the Los Angeles Short Film Festival 2010 and ENCOUNTERS 2010 in Bristol.

Boyd plays the Chief of Delegation in the Luc Beeson (Europacorp) film From Paris with Love, with John Travolta and Jonathan Rhys Meyers. The film was directed by Pierre Morel and written and produced by Luc Besson.

Writer and director 
Boyd created her production company New Thirty Pictures in 2013. She wrote, directed and produced her debut feature film, a supernatural thriller called Widow's Walk. It is set and shot in her native Suffolk. The film stars Miranda Raison, David Caves, Anthony Howell and Virginia McKenna. The film launched on Amazon Prime Video (UK/EU) in December 2019.

She has written, directed and crowdfunded a number of short films. [https://vimeo.com/88017642 Boxer on the Wilderness']' explores themes in her screenplay The Wilderness''. It screened at 15 international film festivals.

Film festivals 
In October 2019 Widow's Walk world premiered at the Chelsea Film Festival in New York where it won the award for Best Cinematography (DP Alex Veitch).

In May 2014, Boxer on the Wilderness screened in the British Independent Film Festival at the Empire Leicester Square and was nominated for Best Short Film and Best Cinematography. The film screened at the East End Film Festival at Stratford East Playhouse and nine additional international film festivals during 2014/15 including the Underwire Film Festival in London, Hollyshorts in Los Angeles, Bornshorts in Denmark, The Portland Film Festival in Portland, OR and The Chelsea Film Festival in New York. It won the Mention d'Honnuer at the "Sport Movies & TV - Milano International FICTS Fest" in December 2014.

Filmography

Film

Television

Video games

External links 
 
 New Thirty Pictures
 Personal Website
 Widow's Walk website

References

English film actors
English people of Scottish descent
English soap opera actresses
English television actresses
English video game actresses
English voice actresses
People from Bangor, Gwynedd
Living people
Alumni of the Drama Studio London
20th-century English actresses
21st-century English actresses
Year of birth missing (living people)